Dieter Fern (born 1 December 1944) is a retired German football forward.

References

External links
 

1944 births
Living people
German footballers
Bayer 04 Leverkusen players
Kickers Offenbach players
VfL Bochum players
Bundesliga players
Association football forwards